"Back Then, Right Now" is a song co-written and recorded by Canadian country music artist Tenille Arts. The song was written by Arts, along with Dave Pittenger, MacKenzie Porter and Parker Welling. It was released on May 4, 2021, as the second single in Canada and lead single in the United States from her fourth studio album Girl to Girl.

Background
Arts stated the song was inspired by her upbringing in small town Saskatchewan, which she described as "really simple times" and "just like any other small town in America". The song was her follow-up single to her number one Mediabase Country hit "Somebody Like That" in the United States, and Arts admitted there was "a lot of pressure" when it came to picking the next single.

Critical reception
Carena Liptak of Taste of Country described the song as "mid-tempo" and "gently swinging", saying it was Arts' take on the "classic country trope of nostalgia, conjuring up crisp images of the carefree nights".

Commercial performance
"Back Then, Right Now" reached a peak of number 12 on the Billboard Canada Country chart for the week of February 12, 2022, spending 25 weeks on the chart in total and marking Arts' fourth career top 20 hit in her home country. It peaked at number 85 on the Canadian Hot 100 for the week of January 15, 2022, becoming her first charting entry on her national all-genre chart. In the United States, the song spent a total of 44 weeks on the Country Airplay chart, peaking at number 34 for the week of April 2, 2022.

Music video
The official music video for "Back Then, Right Now" premiered on July 27, 2021. Arts stated that she had grown up dancing, but hadn't danced in a while. Despite being nervous, she learned the choreography for the dance in the video "pretty easily" and was ready after practicing before the video was shot.

Charts

References

2021 songs
2021 singles
Tenille Arts songs
Songs written by Tenille Arts
Songs written by MacKenzie Porter